Microstigmata is a genus of spiders in the family Microstigmatidae. All species are from South Africa.

Species
, the World Spider Catalog accepted the following species:
Microstigmata amatola Griswold, 1985 – South Africa
Microstigmata geophila (Hewitt, 1916) (type species) – South Africa
Microstigmata lawrencei Griswold, 1985 – South Africa
Microstigmata longipes (Lawrence, 1938) – South Africa
Microstigmata ukhahlamba Griswold, 1985 – South Africa
Microstigmata zuluensis (Lawrence, 1938) – South Africa

References

Mygalomorphae genera
Microstigmatidae
Spiders of South Africa